Fling may refer to:

Arts and entertainment

 Fling (film), a 2008 American comedy film
 The Fling, a 2001 Hank the Cowdog book
 "Fling", an episode of the television series Zoboomafoo
  Fling a messenger App that enabled users to send images to random strangers around the world

Music and dance
 Fling (Irish), a traditional Irish musical form and dance
 Highland Fling, a traditional Scottish dance
 The Fling (band), an American rock group
 "Fling", a song by Built to Spill from There's Nothing Wrong with Love, 1994
 "Fling", a song by Girls Aloud from Tangled Up, 2007

Other uses
 Struggle Front for the National Independence of Guinea (Portuguese: Frente de Luta pela Independência Nacional da Guiné, FLING)
 Fling, a candy product made by Mars, Incorporated

See also
 Flingo, now Samba TV, a smart-TV app
 Flying (disambiguation)